Malaya Berestovitsa is a village in Belarus, Grodno Region, Byerastavitsa District. It is located near the city of Grodno. From 1920 until 1939 it belonged to Second Republic of Poland and was part of the Białystok Voivodeship (1919-1939). A massacre of Polish inhabitants occurred there in 1939.

Village has a Russian Orthodox Church of Saint Dimitri Solunski (built in 1868) and a museum An eighteenth-century estate located in Malaya Berestovitsa is district's architectural monument.

References

 Sights of Malaya Berestovitsa

Villages in Belarus
Populated places in Grodno Region
Grodnensky Uyezd
Białystok Voivodeship (1919–1939)
Belastok Region